Persicula blanda is a species of sea snail, a marine gastropod mollusk, in the family Cystiscidae.

Distribution
This species occurs in the Atlantic Ocean off the Western Sahara.

References

External links
 Hinds, R. B. (1844). Descriptions of Marginellae collected during the voyage of H. M. S. Sulphur, and from the collection of H. Cuming Esq. Proceedings of the Zoological Society of London. (1844) 12: 72-77
 Locard, A. (1897-1898). Expéditions scientifiques du Travailleur et du Talisman pendant les années 1880, 1881, 1882 et 1883. Mollusques testacés. Paris, Masson. vol. 1 

blanda
Gastropods described in 1844